Gavriel David Rosenfeld (born 1967) is President of the Center for Jewish History in New York City and Professor of History at Fairfield University. His areas of academic specialization include the history of Nazi Germany, memory studies, and counterfactual history.  He is an editor of The Journal of Holocaust Research and edits the blog, The Counterfactual History Review, which features news, analysis, and commentary from the world of counterfactual and alternate history.

Early life and education 
Rosenfeld is the son of Alvin H. Rosenfeld, longtime Professor of English and Jewish Studies, former Director of the Robert A. and Sandra S. Borns Jewish Studies Program, and founder of the Institute for the Study of Contemporary Antisemitism at Indiana University, and Erna B. Rosenfeld, former Area Coordinator for Indiana University Residence Life.

Career 

Since 2000, Rosenfeld has taught at Fairfield University, where he offers courses on modern European History, German History, Holocaust History, Jewish History, Historical Memory, and Counterfactual History. During this period, he has published two dozen academic articles, five monographs, and two edited volumes, many of which examine how the memory of the Third Reich and Second World War has taken shape in western culture, especially in architecture, monuments, literature, film, television, and historiography. His 2015 book, Hi Hitler! How the Nazi Past is Being Normalized in Contemporary Culture (Cambridge University Press, 2015), won the German Studies Association's 2017 Sybil Halpern Milton Memorial Book Prize for the best book dealing with Nazi Germany and the Holocaust.  Rosenfeld has also been a leading scholar in the field of counterfactual history, publishing books and articles about the growing importance of historical speculation in western culture. They include The World Hitler Never Made: Alternate History and the Memory of Nazism (2005), What Ifs of Jewish History (2016), "Why Do We Ask 'What If? Reflections on the Function of Alternate History" (2002). and "The Ways We Wonder 'What If?' Towards a Typology of Historical Counterfactuals" (2016).  Rosenfeld's current research focuses on the history and memory of fascism in the United States.  His essays on the topic include "An American Führer? Nazi Analogies and the Struggle to Explain Donald Trump" (2019) and "Donald Trump's Situational Fascism" (2021).

Rosenfeld has published dozens of essays and opinion pieces in such publications as The Washington Post, The Atlantic, The New Republic, The Forward, The Jewish Review of Books, The San Francisco Chronicle, The Hartford Courant, The History News Network, History Today, and The Conversation.  In 2013, he created the blog, The Counterfactual History Review, which recently surpassed 230,000 page views. Rosenfeld has been interviewed by, and had his work cited in, The New York Times, The Wall Street Journal, and The New Yorker, as well as programs on PBS and National Public Radio.

On September 1, 2022, Rosenfeld began his tenure as President of the Center for Jewish History in New York City. He is actively engaged in bolstering the Center's reputation as the world's largest Jewish archive by expanding its public programming and fellowship program.

Books
 (Co-Editor with Janet Ward) Fascism in America: Past and Present (FORTHCOMING: Cambridge University Press, 2023).
The Fourth Reich: The Specter of Nazism from World War II to the Present (Cambridge University Press, 2019).
 (Editor) What Ifs of Jewish History: From Abraham to Zionism (Cambridge University Press, 2016).
Hi Hitler! How the Nazi Past is Being Normalized in Contemporary Culture (Cambridge University Press, 2015).
Building after Auschwitz: Jewish Architecture and the Memory of the Holocaust (New Haven: Yale University Press, 2011).
 (Co-Editor with Paul Jaskot) Beyond Berlin: Twelve German Cities Confront the Nazi Past (Ann Arbor: University of Michigan Press, 2008).
 The World Hitler Never Made: Alternate History and the Memory of Nazism (Cambridge, UK: Cambridge University Press, 2005).
 Munich and Memory: Architecture, Monuments and the Legacy of the Third Reich (Berkeley: University of California Press, 2000).

References

External links
 Profile at Fairfield University
 Profile at Forward
 Interview with Rosenfeld on The Fourth Reich on the New Books Network
 Interview on The Fourth Reich on Rhode Island PBS
 Rosenfeld on The Fourth Reich in History Today

21st-century American historians
21st-century American male writers
Fairfield University faculty
Living people
Year of birth missing (living people)
Brown University alumni
American male non-fiction writers